OSK or Osk may refer to:

 Ósk, an Icelandic feminine given name
 OS-K group, a candidate phylum of bacteria from Octopus spring, Yellowstone National Park
 On-screen keyboard, a computer user interface device
 Orchestre Symphonique Kimbanguiste, a Congolese orchestra
 ÖSK, Örebro SK, a Swedish professional football and bandy club
 Ortaköy Spor Kulübü, a Turkish sports club
 Osaka Shosen Kaisha, a former Japanese shipping company
 Ōsaki Station, JR East station code
 OSK Holdings Berhad, a Malaysian financial services company
 Oslo SK, a Norwegian sports club